Mohamed Baabit (born in  August 28 1988 in Marrakesh, Morocco) also known as  SimoLifedotocom  he is a Moroccan businessman, digital marketing adviser, and e-commerce specialist. On May 24, during the Affiliate Grand Slam conference that was held in the United Arab Emirates 2021, “Mohamed Baabit” with the corporation of  C.O.D Network project won the award for Best Digital Marketing Influencer in the world .

Career 
Mohamed Baabit acheived his first 1 million dollars in sales at the age of twenty-two, and he earned 1 million dollars, in net income at the age of twenty-six. According to one of his statements, “Simo Life” introduced himself, saying: "He is a Moroccan-Arab businessman who started from scratch, and his fortune exceeds 80 million dollars".

On May 24, 2021, he won the award for Best Digital Marketing Influencer in the world with his partners in the C.O.D Network project, during the Affiliate Grand Slam conference that was held in the United Arab Emirates.

References

External links
 

1988 births
Living people
Moroccan businesspeople
People from Marrakesh